

Current roster
Season 2022

Coach:  Risco Herlambang

Jakarta Elektrik PLN is an Indonesian women's volleyball club owned and managed by the Perusahaan Listrik Negara that plays at the Proliga.

History
The first championship won by the club was in 2004 and the next year, the club was the runner-up.

In 2009 and 2011 the club won again the championship, having won the silver medal in 2008, 2010 and 2012. The next championships were in 2015 and 2016. The club participated at the 2016 Asian Women's Club Volleyball Championship.

Honours
Proliga
Champions (6): 2004, 2009, 2011, 2015, 2016, 2017
Runners-up (4): 2005, 2008, 2010, 2012

References

Indonesian volleyball clubs
Volleyball clubs established in 2004